Kiswa (kiswat al-ka'bah) is the cloth that covers the Kaaba in Mecca, Saudi Arabia. It is draped annually on the 9th day of the month of Dhu al-Hijjah, the day pilgrims leave for the plains of Mount Arafat during the Hajj. A procession traditionally accompanies the kiswa to Mecca, a tradition dating back to the 12th century. The term kiswa has multiple translations, with common ones being 'robe' or 'garment'. Due to the iconic designs and the quality of materials used in creating the kiswa, it is considered one of the most sacred objects in Islamic art, ritual, and worship.

The annual practice of covering the Kaaba has pre-Islamic origins and was continued by Muhammad and his successors. Historically, various types of cloth and textiles have been used as draping, but Egyptian produced kiswas would be popularized by early Islamic rulers.

History

Pre-Islamic History 
The tradition of covering the Kaaba predates the emergence of Islam, with various Yemeni textiles composing the draping. According to Ibn Hisham, King Tubba Abu Karab As'ad of the Himyarite Kingdom, who is traditionally considered a convert to Judaism, clothed Kaaba for the first time during the rule of the Jurhum tribe of Mecca in the early fifth century CE. Tubba later covered the Kaaba in a red, striped woolen garment, layering it atop the already existing hangings. The Quraysh, the ruling confederation of tribes in Mecca, later organized funding for the kiswa using annually collected payments from each of the tribes who worshipped there.

The Kiswa in the era of Muhammad
Muhammad and the Muslims in Mecca did not participate in the draping of the Kaaba until the conquest of the city at 630 AD (7 AH), as the ruling tribe, Quraish, did not allow them to do so. When the Muslims took Mecca, they left the old hangings in place, with Muhammad adding his own kiswa of Yemeni origin. Muhammad’s successors would continue the tradition of draping the kiswa, with Umar al-Khattab being the first caliph to send an Egyptian kiswa made out of a white linen known as qubati (Arabic: قُبْطِيّ), a type of embroidered linen manufactured by Coptic Christians living in Egypt.

The Kiswa under the Umayyads and Abbasids 

The pre-Islamic hangings covering the Kaaba would remain until the rule of Umayyad caliph Mu’awiya, who removed the old hangings after receiving complaints that they were religiously impure. A new kiswa was sent by Mu’awiya made out of silk, qubati, and striped wool. Following the original replacement of the old hangings, the caliph sent two kiswas annually, with one being made out of qubati and the other silk; the silk kiswa is reported to have been draped over the former which would arrive in Mecca at least three months prior. Successive Umayyad caliphs would adhere to the precedent set by Mu’awiya and continue to supply kiswas made either of Egyptian linen or silk and drape them over the coverings from previous years. Much like their Umayyad predecessors, the Abbasids continued to rely on Egyptian factories for the production of the kiswa. However, the Abbasid caliph Al-Mahdi would establish the precedent of annually removing and replacing the old kiswa after realizing the accumulated weight from the old kiswas could structurally compromise the Kaaba following his pilgrimage to Mecca in 777 CE.

Location of manufacture
From the time of the Ayyubids, precisely during the reign of as-Salih Ayyub, the kiswa was manufactured in Egypt, with material sourced locally as well as from Sudan, India, and Iraq. The Amir al-Hajj (commander of the hajj caravan), who was directly designated by the sultans of the Mamluk, and later, Ottoman Empires, transported the kiswa from Egypt to Mecca on an annual basis. Muhammad Ali Pasha of Egypt ordered the expenses for making the kiswa to be met by his state treasury in the early 19th century. Since then, Dar Al-Khoronfosh, a workshop in Cairo’s Al-Gamaleya district, had been selected for the task of making the kiswa, and continued this role throughout the reign of the Egyptian monarchy. After the take over of the Hijaz region, and from 1927 onward, its manufacture was partially moved to Mecca and then fully moved in 1962, when Egypt stopped manufacturing.

Tradition

Historic procession of the Kaaba 

The procession of the kiswa and its journey to Mecca dates back to 1184 CE from an account by Ibn Jubayr. According to Ibn Jubayr, the kiswa was brought to Mecca via camel from its place of creation along with an elaborate procession of drums and flags. The kiswa was then placed on the roof of the Kaaba once it reached Mecca, still folded. On the 134th day of the month of Dhu al-Hijjah, the Banu Shayba completely unfolded the cloth to fully display the embroideries and their inscriptions.

The tradition of the kiswa being accompanied by a covering called the mahmal during the trip to Mecca is said to have started during the rule of Queen Shajar al-Durr, however the practice was not widely accepted as tradition until the 15th century. It is unclear whether the mahmal carries the kiswa itself or simply accompanies the cloth to Mecca due to the lack of access to the processional covering, however it is said that in modern times the mahmal carries the new kiswa to Mecca and then takes the old kiswa to Cairo after the Hajj is completed.

Design and Textiles of the Kaaba

Design 

Today the Kiswa’s design features the colors black, gold, and silver. Black silk linen comprises the entirety of the garment, displaying large unaccented sections and providing background to the portions with inscriptions. The gold and silver comprise the inscriptions and accents that embellish the garment. Rendered in the Thuluth calligraphy style, these characters overlap each other and protrude slightly from the kiswa itself. The Sura Ikhlas appears in circular medallions inscribed within squares at each of the four corners of the kiswa: Rukn al-Hajjar al-Aswad (Arabic: ركن الحجر الأسواد), Rukn al-'Iraqi (Arabic: الركن العراقي), Rukn al-Yamani (Arabic: الركن اليميني), Rukn ush-Shami (Arabic: الركن الشامي). These are beneath the hizam where longer Qur’anic verses appear. Artisans carefully interweave gold and silver wire to create these elements which appear brilliant on the black silk. Previous iterations have featured more colorful and varied design programs. However, kiswas dating earlier than the Ottoman period are rare due to natural degradation as well as a now defunct practice of cutting the kiswa and selling the pieces to pilgrims.

Textiles 
The textile covering of the Kaaba has multiple parts including, the hizam (Arabic: حزام) and sitara (Arabic: سِتَارَة) or burqu''' (Arabic: برقع). The earliest known still-extant sitara was manufactured in Egypt and dates to 1544, and the earliest Ottoman hizam was made for Selim II in the late 16th century. The basic designs of the hizam and sitara have changed little over time, although the embroidery in gold and silver wire has become more ornate. All inscriptions on the kiswa, hizam, sitara, and supplemental textiles use the Thuluth (Arabic: ثُلُث) style of calligraphy. Between 1817 and 1927, the kiswa was manufactured at the Dar al-Kiswa, a dedicated workshop in Cairo, Egypt. In 1927 textile manufacturing moved to a workshop in Mecca.

 Kiswa 
The term kiswa refers to the overall covering of the Kaaba. The fabric contains 670 kilograms of imported white silk thread that is then dyed black. Jacquard machines weave the black thread into either plain or patterned cloth equaling forty-seven pieces of cloth measuring 98 centimeters by 14 meters. The patterned cloth contains inscriptions taken from the Shahada (Arabic: ٱلشَّهَادَةُ) incorporated into the fabric during the weaving process. Each panel of cloth is then stretched over a loom and templates of verses from the Quran (Arabic: اَلْقُرْآنُ or ٱلۡقُرۡءَانُ) and Islamic ornamental patterns are applied using silk screens. Embroidered decorative elements, Quranic verses, and prayers are hand-embroidered by Saudi artisans using gold and silver thread. The only stylistic requirement for the text and decorations is that it must be visible from a distance. Once the embroidery is applied the cloth is sewn together and a white cotton calico backing is applied for support. The finished kiswa measures 658 square meters and costs 22 million SAR to produce.

 Hizam 
Two-thirds of the way up the kiswa is an embroidered band called the hizam. The band comprises 16 pieces of silk cloth with four pieces attached to each side of the Kaaba. Assembled, the hizam measures 47 meters in length and 95 centimeters in width. The text on the hizam consists of Quranic verses embroidered with gold and silver thread. Under the belt at each corner of the Kaaba is an additional set of square panels of cloth called the kardashiyyat containing the Surah of Ikhlas (Arabic: الْإِخْلَاص).
 Sitara 
Over the exterior door to the Kaaba is a cover called the burqu' or sitara. This panel is the most elaborately decorated portion of the kiswa. The sitara has an average size of 7.75 meters by 3.5 meters and is assembled by sewing together four separate cloth panels. Each panel contains embroidered verses from the Quran and additional dedications.

 Additional Textiles 
Other textiles used in covering portions of the Kaaba include a curtain hung over the Bab al-Tawba door in the interior of the Kaaba. Also remade each year is the green silk bag which holds the key to the Kaaba, a tradition introduced in 1987. Along with these textiles, the workshops send ropes for attaching the kiswa to the Kaaba, and spare silk in case the kiswa needs repair. Degradation and disfiguration caused by exposure to natural elements and popular rituals, such as the taking of a piece of the kiswa'', necessitate regular maintenance.

References

External links

A historical look at the Kiswah

Kaaba
Islamic architectural elements
Textiles
Hajj terminology